Review is an American magazine covering national and international economic issues. It is published by the Federal Reserve Bank of St. Louis.

References

External links
 Official website

1962 establishments in Missouri
Business magazines published in the United States
Magazines established in 1962
Magazines published in St. Louis
Quarterly magazines published in the United States